The Great Ohio Bicycle Adventure (GOBA) is a week-long bicycle tour. Each year it features a different part of Ohio. The tour averages 50 miles each day.  As with other bicycle tours, GOBA is not a race.  There is plenty of time to complete each day's ride as well as stopping at the tourist destinations along the route.  One of the things that smake this bicycle tour significant is that it has been around since 1989. The tour has grown to accommodate 3000 riders who visit from around the word.  GOBA is primarily a tent camping ,tour but trucks deliver riders' bags to the designated campgrouns.  Typical campgrounds are fairgrounds, sch,ools and pars.  When GOBA arrives in a host town, the red carpet is rolled out with entertainment and food. Unlike other tours like RAGBRAI, SAGBRAW or BRAG, GOBA ends its route in the first day's departure city.

Since 1993, there have been layover days, where you can take an optional loop or stay in that city. There used to be only one, but now there are 2.

GOBA is a project of Columbus Outdoor Pursuits (COP), a volunteer-based organization that provides opportunities and education for outdoor recreation.

External links
 GOBA website
 Bicycle Tour Network Directory
 Columbus Outdoor Pursuits
Cycling in Ohio
Bicycle tours
Cycling events in the United States